Those Drinking Days is a 1981 memoir by novelist Donald Newlove about his alcoholism.

It became his bestselling book.

References

Further reading 

 
 
 https://www.newspapers.com/search/?query=%22those%20drinking%20days%22%20newlove

1981 non-fiction books
English-language books